Kanasín (In the Yucatec Maya language: “tense or strongly tightened”) is a city in the Mexican state of Yucatán and the municipal seat of the municipality of the same name. It is located in the northwestern region of the state, forming part of the Mérida metropolitan area. According to the 2020 census carried out by the National Institute of Statistics and Geography (INEGI), it had a population of 139,753, making it the second largest Yucatecan city after Mérida, the 8th most populous in southeastern Mexico and the 101st most populous in the country.

In pre-Columbian times, the space that the city currently occupies was located in the ancient Mayan chiefdom of Chakan. Kanasín was established around the mid-16th century under the encomienda tributary system following the Spanish conquest of Yucatán. The name of the city derives precisely from a Mayan language term used to name a plant with reddish flowers that grows in the area. In 2007, it officially received city status. At the end of 2021, it hosted the First Ibero-American Meeting of Poetry. Today, it is a significant development pole as an industrial corridor for the state, together with the nearby city of Umán, which is also a suburb of Mérida.

History
It is unknown which chieftainship the area was under prior to the arrival of the Spanish. After the conquest the area became part of the encomienda system. One of the first encomenderos was Francisco Sosa, with 209 Indians in his charge. Later it passed to Josefa Díaz Bolio, who had care of 211 Indians and then to reverend Sister María Josefa, with 155 Indians.

Yucatán declared its independence from the Spanish Crown in 1821 and in 1825, Kanasín was established as head of its own municipality.

Governance
Kanasín is the municipal seat of its eponymous municipality. Its municipal president is elected for a three-year term. Its town council has nine councilpersons, who serve as Secretary and councilors of policing and neighborhoods, public works, health and ecology, education, culture and sports, public monuments, parks and gardens, transportation, and nomenclature.

The Municipal Council administers the business of the municipality. It is responsible for budgeting and expenditures and producing all required reports for all branches of the municipal administration. Annually it determines educational standards for schools.

The Police Commissioners ensure public order and safety. They are tasked with enforcing regulations, distributing materials and administering rulings of general compliance issued by the council.

Neighborhoods and subdivisions 
Kanasín follows a mostly grid-like street layout, being made up of the following neighborhoods and subdivisions:
Neighborhoods

Subdivisions

Demographics

Local festivals
 8 December Celebration to honor the Immaculate Conception
29 January to 2 February Feast of the Virgin de la Candelaria
March Popular carnival

Tourist attractions
 Church of San José, built in the seventeenth century
Hacienda San Ildefonso Teya

References

Municipality seats in Yucatán
Populated places in Yucatán